Guilin is a subzone of Bukit Batok. It is bounded by East Avenue 2, Central, West Avenue 2/5, the north side of Bukit Gombak Sports Complex, the west and north perimeters of Town Park, the west perimeter of landed housing estates along Hillview Avenue, and Hillview Avenue.

Places

Guilin takes its name from Xiao Guilin (小桂林), an area within Bukit Batok Town Park. Directly translated to Little Guilin, this section of the park is named after the Guilin region in China - sporting a granite quarry within a small pond.

Politics
It is part of 'Bukit Gombak' division of the Chua Chu Kang Constituency.

Neighbouring Areas

References

External links

Places in Singapore
Bukit Batok